Savia is an album by J-pop singer Mami Kawada. It is her 2nd studio album overall produced by I've Sound and Geneon Entertainment. The album was released on March 26, 2008.

This album's catalog number is GNCV-1001 for the Regular Edition (CD only) and GNCV-1002 for the Limited Edition (CD+DVD). The DVD will contain the PV for the song portamento.

The album has 13 songs and some of the songs came from her previous singles Akai Namida/Beehive, Get my way! and JOINT. There are 8 new songs plus an album remix of her song Beehive. 翡翠 -HISUI- was used as the theme song for the movie adaptation of the game OneChanbara which marked her first non-anime tie-in. sense will be used as one of the insert songs for the anime series Shakugan no Shana II.

This album garnered the #15 position in the Oricon charts with a first-week sales of 9,504 units. This album charted for a total of 5 weeks.

Track listing

energy flow - 2:09
Composition: Tomoyuki Nakazawa
Arrangement: Tomoyuki Nakazawa, Takeshi Ozaki
JOINT - 4:01
Composition: Tomoyuki Nakazawa
Arrangement: Tomoyuki Nakazawa, Takeshi Ozaki
Lyrics: Mami Kawada
Beehive -album edit- - 4:28
Composition: Tomoyuki Nakazawa
Arrangement: Tomoyuki Nakazawa, Takeshi Ozaki
Lyrics: Mami Kawada
TRILL - 4:50
Composition/Arrangement: Kazuya Takase
Lyrics: Mami Kawada
 - 4:19
Composition/Arrangement: Tomoyuki Nakazawa
Lyrics: Mami Kawada
triangle - 4:50
Composition/Arrangement: Kazuya Takase
Lyrics: Mami Kawada
sense - 4:13
Composition: Tomoyuki Nakazawa
Arrangement: Tomoyuki Nakazawa, Takeshi Ozaki
Lyrics: Mami Kawada
DREAM - 5:35
Composition/Arrangement: Maiko Iuchi
Lyrics: Mami Kawada
intron tone - 4:22
Composition: Tomoyuki Nakazawa
Arrangement: Tomoyuki Nakazawa, Takeshi Ozaki, Kazuya Takase
Lyrics: Mami Kawada
翡翠 -HISUI- - 5:30
Composition: C.G mix
Arrangement: C.G mix, Takeshi Ozaki
Lyrics: Mami Kawada
 - 5:50
Composition/Arrangement: Maiko Iuchi
Lyrics: Mami Kawada
Get my way! - 2:56
Composition: Kazuya Takase
Arrangement: Kazuya Takase, Takeshi Ozaki
Lyrics: Mami Kawada
portamento - 6:01
Composition: Tomoyuki Nakazawa
Arrangement: Tomoyuki Nakazawa, Takeshi Ozaki
Lyrics: Mami Kawada

Charts and sales

References

Mami Kawada albums
2008 albums